Lake Stanley Draper is a reservoir in southeast Oklahoma City, United States. It is one of three municipal reservoirs in the city. It was constructed in 1962-1963, and named for the long-time director of the Oklahoma City Chamber of Commerce.  Located between Midwest Boulevard and Post Road, near I-240, it receives water by pipeline from Atoka Lake and McGee Creek Reservoir.

History
The lake was begun in 1962 to serve as a reservoir for Oklahoma City.

Description
The volume is

Recreation
The lake is open for a number of things including, fishing, ATV'S or dirt bikes, R.C. airplanes, boating (sailing, Water skiing, and jet skiing). Water skiing is allowed in the main body of the lake, but swimming is prohibited everywhere in the lake. There are four covered fishing piers, primitive campgrounds, picnic grounds, grills and rest rooms.  The marina's website is www.lakedraper.com

Maintenance
In March 2010 City of Oklahoma City began work for the Atoka Pump Station Rehabilitation Project (APSRP). During the project 24 new pumps were installed while six others were refurbished along the  Atoka Pipeline. Because of the low water levels all boating is prohibited, with only authorized personnel allowed on the water. On February 25, 2011, the pipeline was brought back to full service allowing water to be pumped from Lake Atoka to Draper. From February 2011 the lake's water level remained low due to the lack of heavy rainfall because of the then ongoing drought and water usage by residents of Oklahoma City. The City expected that the lake would return to levels high enough to allow recreational use by late fall 2013. In April 2015 following substantial rainfall, the lake reached and passed its pool depth, bringing the lake back to full capacity.

Notes

Bad link

References

Geography of Oklahoma City
Protected areas of Cleveland County, Oklahoma
Stanley Draper
Tourist attractions in Oklahoma City
Bodies of water of Cleveland County, Oklahoma
Infrastructure completed in 1963